The year 1618 in science and technology involved some significant events.

Astronomy
 March 8 – May 15 – Johannes Kepler formulates the third law of planetary motion.
 July 21 – Pluto (not known at this time) reaches an aphelion. It next comes to aphelion in 1866.
 Johann Baptist Cysat, Swiss Jesuit geometer and astronomer and one of Christoph Scheiner's pupils, becomes the first to study a comet through the telescope and gives the first description of the nucleus and coma of a comet.
 September 6–25 – The Great Comet of 1618 is visible to the naked eye.

Biology
 Fortunio Liceti's De spontaneo Viventium Ortu supports the theory of spontaneous generation of organisms.

Medicine
 The College of Physicians of London publishes the Pharmacopœia Londinensis.

Births
 April 2 – Francesco Maria Grimaldi, Italian physicist, discoverer of the diffraction of light (died 1663)
 Jeremiah Horrocks, English astronomer (died 1641)

Deaths
 June 6 – Sir James Lancaster, English navigator (born 1554)
 October 29 – Walter Ralegh, English explorer (born c. 1554)
 Luca Valerio, Italian mathematician (born 1553)

References

 
17th century in science
1610s in science